A tournament is a directed graph (digraph) obtained by assigning a direction for each edge in an undirected complete graph. That is, it is an orientation of a complete graph, or equivalently a directed graph in which every pair of distinct vertices is connected by a directed edge (often, called an arc) with any one of the two possible orientations.

Current applications of tournaments include the study of voting theory and social choice theory among other things.

The name tournament originates from such a graph's interpretation as the outcome of a round-robin tournament in which every player encounters every other player exactly once, and in which no draws occur. In the tournament digraph, the vertices correspond to the players. The edge between each pair of players is oriented from the winner to the loser.  If player  beats player , then it is said that  dominates . If every player beats the same number of other players (indegree = outdegree), the tournament is called regular.

Paths and cycles 

Another basic result on tournaments is that every strongly connected tournament has a Hamiltonian cycle. More strongly, every strongly connected tournament is vertex pancyclic: for each vertex , and each  in the range from three to the number of vertices in the tournament, there is a cycle of length  containing .
If the tournament is 4‑strongly connected, then each pair of vertices can be connected with a Hamiltonian path. For every set  of at most  arcs of a -strongly connected tournament , we have that  has a Hamiltonian cycle.

Transitivity 

In other words, in a transitive tournament, the vertices may be (strictly) totally ordered by the edge relation, and the edge relation is the same as reachability.

Equivalent conditions
The following statements are equivalent for a tournament  on  vertices:

  is transitive.
  is a strict total ordering.
  is acyclic.
  does not contain a cycle of length 3.
  has exactly one Hamiltonian path.

Ramsey theory
Transitive tournaments play a role in Ramsey theory analogous to that of cliques in undirected graphs. In particular, every tournament on  vertices contains a transitive subtournament on  vertices. For instance, every tournament on seven vertices contains a three-vertex transitive subtournament; the Paley tournament on seven vertices shows that this is the most that can be guaranteed . However,   showed that this bound is not tight for some larger values of .

 proved that there are tournaments on  vertices without a transitive subtournament of size  Their proof uses a counting argument: the number of ways that a -element transitive tournament can occur as a subtournament of a larger tournament on  labeled vertices is

Paradoxical tournaments
A player who wins all games would naturally be the tournament's winner. However, as the existence of non-transitive tournaments shows, there may not be such a player. A tournament for which every player loses at least one game is called a 1-paradoxical tournament. More generally, a tournament  is called -paradoxical if for every -element subset  of  there is a vertex  in  such that  for all . There is an explicit construction of -paradoxical tournaments with  players by Graham and Spencer (1971) namely the Paley tournament.

Condensation
The condensation of any tournament is itself a transitive tournament. Thus, even for tournaments that are not transitive, the strongly connected components of the tournament may be totally ordered.

Score sequences and score sets
The score sequence of a tournament is the nondecreasing sequence of outdegrees of the vertices of a tournament.  The score set of a tournament is the set of integers that are the outdegrees of vertices in that tournament.

Landau's Theorem (1953) A nondecreasing sequence of integers  is a score sequence if and only if :
 
 
 

Let  be the number of different score sequences of size . The sequence   starts as:

1, 1, 1, 2, 4, 9, 22, 59, 167, 490, 1486, 4639, 14805, 48107, ...

Winston and Kleitman proved that for sufficiently large n:

where 
Takács later showed, using some reasonable but unproven assumptions, that

where 

Together these provide evidence that:

Here  signifies an asymptotically tight bound.

Yao showed that every nonempty set of nonnegative integers is the score set for some tournament.

Majority relations 
In social choice theory, tournaments naturally arise as majority relations of preference profiles.
We interpret each order  as the preference ranking of a voter . If the number  of voters is odd, then the majority relation forms the dominance relation of a tournament on vertex set .

By a lemma of McGarvey, every tournament on  vertices can be obtained as the majority relation of at most  voters. Results by Stearns and Erdős & Moser later established that  voters are needed to induce every tournament on  vertices.

Laslier (1997) studies in what sense a set of vertices can be called the set of "winners" of a tournament. This revealed to be useful in Political Science to study, in formal models of political economy, what can be the outcome of a democratic process.

See also 
 Oriented graph
 Paley tournament
 Sumner's conjecture
 Tournament solution

Notes

References 
.
.
 .
.
.
.
.
.

 .
.
.
 .
 .
.
.
 .
 .

Directed graphs